Chiradzulu is a town in Malawi, and the administrative capital of the Chiradzulu District.

It is famous because it is where the home and church of John Chilembwe is located. It was the site of European farming settlement.

Notable people

John Chilembwe
Giddess Chalamanda

References

Populated places in Southern Region, Malawi